is a Japanese kickboxer, currently competing in the super featherweight division of K-1. He is a two-time Krush Super Featherweight title challenger. 

He was ranked as a top ten bantamweight by Combat Press between August 2020 and April 2022.

Kickboxing career
Oiwa made his Krush debut during Krush 49, with a unanimous decision win over Masafumi Kurasaki. He alternated wins and losses over his next six fights, defeating Yuzo Suzuki, Masafumi Kurasaki and Hikaru Fujihashi, but losing to Yuta Otaki, Hirotaka Asahisa and Kaito Ozawa.

Tatsuya then went on a three fight winning streak, winning a unanimous decision against Kento Ito, a split decision against Ryusei Ashizawa and a TKO win over Kazuki Koyano. The winning streak was snapped by Taio Asahisa, who won a unanimous decision during Krush 82.

Oiwa bounced back by winning his next four fights, a unanimous decision against Toshio, a majority decision against Takumi Yokoyama, a knockout win over Yutaka and a TKO win over Masahiro Yamamoto.

Oiwa challenged for a major title for the first time in his career during Krush 96, when he fought the reigning Krush Super Featherweight champion Kotaro Shimano. Shimano won the fight by unanimous decision.

After his failed title bid, Oiwa won his next two fights. He first defeated Kyohei Hayashi by a first-round KO, and won the rematch with Ryusei Ashizawa by unanimous decision. Tatsuya then fought Koji during K-1 World GP 2019: Japan vs World 5 vs 5, and lost the fight by split decision, after an extra round was fought. Oiwa won his next fight against Stavros Exakoustidis by unanimous decision.

He fought for the Krush Super Featherweight title for the second time in his career during Krush 115, when he challenged the incumbent champion Leona Pettas. Pettas won the fight by unanimous decision.

Oiwa was scheduled to fight Hirotaka Asahisa during the K-1 World GP 2020 in Fukuoka. He lost the fight by unanimous decision. He was next scheduled to fight Naoki Yamamoto at Krush 123. He won the fight by a third-round knockout.

Oiwa was scheduled to fight the former K-1 Featherweight champion Yuki Egawa at K-1 World GP 2021 in Fukuoka. Egawa later withdrew from due bout due to COVID-19 protocols. The pair was rescheduled to face each other at K-1: K'Festa 5 on April 3, 2022. Oiwa won the fight by unanimous decision, with scores of 30–29, 30–29 and 30–28..

Oiwa faced Adam Bouarourou in the quarterfinals of the 2022 K-1 Super Featherweight World Grand Prix. He won the fight by unanimous decision. Oiwa advanced to the tournament semifinals, where faced Leona Pettas, in a rematch of their June 28, 2020, bout, which Oiwa lost by decision. Oiwa once again came up short, as Pettas won the fight by a third-round knockout.

Oiwa wax expected to face Kaito Ozawa at K-1 World GP 2023: K'Festa 6 on March 12, 2023. Ozawa withdrew from the fight on March 8, due to a bone contusion of a metacarpal bone, and was replaced by Yuta Kuneida. He won the fight by a second-round knockout.

Titles and accomplishments
BigBang
2021 Bigbang Lightweight Champion

Fight record

|- style="background:#cfc;"
| 2023-03-12 || Win||align=left| Yuta Kunieda || K-1 World GP 2023: K'Festa 6 || Tokyo, Japan || KO (Right overhand)|| 2 ||1:37 

|-  style="text-align:center; background:#fbb;"
| 2022-09-11 || Loss|| align=left| Leona Pettas  ||  K-1 World GP 2022 Yokohamatsuri, Tournament Semifinals|| Yokohama, Japan || KO (Flying knee) ||3 ||0:12 

|-  style="text-align:center; background:#cfc;"
| 2022-09-11 || Win || align=left| Adam Bouarourou ||  K-1 World GP 2022 Yokohamatsuri, Tournament Quarterfinals  || Yokohama, Japan || Decision (Unanimous) || 3 || 3:00
|-
|- style="background:#cfc" 
| 2022-04-03 || Win ||align=left| Yuki Egawa || K-1: K'Festa 5 || Tokyo, Japan || Decision (Unanimous) || 3 || 3:00
|-  style="background:#cfc;"
| 2021-11-14 || Win ||align=left| Takuma || Super Bigbang 2021|| Yokohama, Japan|| Decision (Unanimous)  || 3 ||3:00 
|-
! style=background:white colspan=9 |
|-  style="background:#cfc;"
| 2021-03-27 || Win||align=left|  Naoki Yamamoto  || Krush 123 || Tokyo, Japan|| KO (Right Hook) || 3 ||
|-  style="background:#fbb;"
| 2020-11-03 || Loss ||align=left| Hirotaka Asahisa || K-1 World GP 2020 in Fukuoka || Fukuoka, Japan|| Decision (Unanimous) || 3 || 3:00
|-  style="background:#fbb;"
| 2020-07-21 || Loss ||align=left| Leona Pettas || Krush 115 || Tokyo, Japan|| Decision (Unanimous) || 3 || 3:00
|-
! style=background:white colspan=9 |
|-  style="background:#cfc;"
| 2019-12-28 || Win||align=left| Stavros Exakoustidis || K-1 World GP 2019 Japan: ～Women's Flyweight Championship Tournament～ || Nagoya, Japan|| Decision (Unanimous) || 3 || 3:00
|-  style="background:#fbb;"
| 2019-08-24 || Loss ||align=left| Koji || K-1 World GP 2019: Japan vs World 5 vs 5 || Osaka, Japan|| Ext.R Decision (Split) || 4 || 3:00
|-  style="background:#cfc;"
| 2019-06-30 || Win||align=left| Ryusei Ashizawa || K-1 World GP 2019: Super Bantamweight World Tournament || Tokyo, Japan|| Decision (Unanimous) || 3 || 3:00
|-  style="background:#cfc;"
| 2019-03-30 || Win||align=left| Kyohei Hayashi || Krush 99 || Tokyo, Japan|| KO (Right straight) || 1 || 1:03
|-  style="background:#fbb;"
| 2018-12-16 || Loss ||align=left| Kotaro Shimano || Krush 96 || Tokyo, Japan|| Decision (Unanimous) || 3 || 3:00
|-
! style=background:white colspan=9 |
|-  style="background:#cfc;"
| 2018-08-18 || Win ||align=left| Masahiro Yamamoto || Krush 92 || Nagoya, Japan|| TKO (Three knockdowns) || 2 || 2:58
|-  style="background:#cfc;"
| 2018-05-17 || Win ||align=left| Yutaka || Krush 88 || Tokyo, Japan|| KO (Right Hook) || 3 || 0:35
|-  style="background:#cfc;"
| 2018-03-21 || Win ||align=left| Takumi Yokoyama || K-1 World GP 2018: K'FESTA.1 || Saitama, Japan|| Decision (Majority) || 3 || 3:00
|-  style="background:#cfc;"
| 2018-01-27 || Win ||align=left| Toshio || Krush 84 || Tokyo, Japan|| Decision (Unanimous) || 3 || 3:00
|-  style="background:#fbb;"
| 2017-11-05 || Loss ||align=left| Taio Asahisa || Krush 82 || Tokyo, Japan|| Decision (Unanimous) || 3 || 3:00
|-  style="background:#cfc;"
| 2017-08-20 || Win ||align=left| Kazuki Koyano || Krush 79 || Nagoya, Japan|| TKO (Cut to the eyebrow) || 1 || 2:40
|-  style="background:#cfc;"
| 2017-05-28 || Win ||align=left| Ryusei Ashizawa || Krush 76 || Tokyo, Japan|| Decision (Split) || 3 || 3:00
|-  style="background:#cfc;"
| 2016-12-18 || Win ||align=left| Kento Ito || Krush 71 || Tokyo, Japan|| Decision (Unanimous) || 3 || 3:00
|-  style="background:#fbb;"
| 2016-08-20 || Loss ||align=left| Kaito Ozawa || Krush 68 || Tokyo, Japan|| Decision (Split) || 3 || 3:00
|-  style="background:#cfc;"
| 2016-04-10 || Win ||align=left| Hikaru Fujihashi || Krush 65 || Tokyo, Japan|| TKO (Punches) || 3 || 2:33
|-  style="background:#fbb;"
| 2016-01-17 || Loss ||align=left| Hirotaka Asahisa || Krush 62 || Tokyo, Japan|| Decision (Unanimous) || 3 || 3:00
|-  style="background:#cfc;"
| 2015-08-22 || Win ||align=left| Masafumi Kurasaki || Krush 57 || Nagoya, Japan|| Decision (Unanimous) || 3 || 3:00
|-  style="background:#fbb;"
| 2015-06-12 || Loss ||align=left| Yuta Otaki || Krush 55 || Tokyo, Japan|| Decision (Unanimous) || 3 || 3:00
|-  style="background:#cfc;"
| 2015-04-12 || Win ||align=left| Yuzo Suzuki || Krush 53 || Tokyo, Japan|| KO (Knee to the body) || 2 || 1:47
|-  style="background:#cfc;"
| 2015-01-04 || Win ||align=left| Masafumi Kurasaki || Krush 49 || Tokyo, Japan|| Decision (Majority) || 3 || 3:00
|-
| colspan=9 | Legend:

See also
List of male kickboxers

References

1992 births
Living people
Japanese male kickboxers
Bantamweight kickboxers
People from Nagoya
Sportspeople from Nagoya